Isayevo is a rural locality (a village) in Gaynskoye Rural Settlement, Gaynsky District, Perm Krai, Russia. The population was 7 as of 2010.

Geography 
Isayevo is located 16 km southeast of Gayny (the district's administrative centre) by road. Ankudinovo is the nearest rural locality.

References 

Rural localities in Gaynsky District